Defending champion Sania Mirza and her partner Martina Hingis defeated Garbiñe Muguruza and Carla Suárez Navarro in the final, 6–0, 6–3 to win the doubles tennis title at the 2015 WTA Finals.

Cara Black and Mirza were the reigning champions, but Black did not qualify this year.

Seeds

Draw

Finals

Red group

White group

References 
 Doubles Draw

Finals
2015 doubles